Peter Lund Creek is a stream in Freeborn County, in the U.S. state of Minnesota.

The creek was named for Peter Lund, a Norwegian pioneer settler who afterward served as the township's treasurer.

See also
List of rivers of Minnesota

References

Rivers of Freeborn County, Minnesota
Rivers of Minnesota